Andre Pierre Hines (born February 28, 1958 in Oakland, California) is a former American football offensive tackle in the National Football League. He was drafted by the Seattle Seahawks in the 2nd round of the 1980 NFL Draft. He played college football at Stanford.

References

Living people
1958 births
Seattle Seahawks players
American football offensive tackles
Stanford Cardinal football players